"Show You Off" is  a song recorded by American country music duo Dan + Shay for their debut studio album, Where It All Began (2014). The uptempo country track was written by group members Dan Smyers and Shay Mooney along with Danny Orton, and was produced by Smyers with additional production by Orton and Scott Hendricks. It was released through Warner Bros. Nashville on May 12, 2014 as the second single from the album. "Show You Off" was well received by country radio, becoming the most-added track in its debut week.

Music video
The music video was directed by Patrick Tracy and premiered in July 2014. It consists entirely of footage from the duo's live shows.

Chart performance
"Show You Off" debuted at number 51 on the U.S. Billboard Country Airplay chart for the week of May 24, 2014.  The song has sold 159,000 copies in the US as of December 2014.

Year-end charts

Certifications

References

2014 songs
2014 singles
Dan + Shay songs
Warner Records singles
Songs written by Danny Orton
Songs written by Shay Mooney
Songs written by Dan Smyers
Song recordings produced by Scott Hendricks